Perdido County (from the  Spanish word for "lost") was the name of a now defunct county in Texas. Created in the 1820s, prior to the Texas Revolution, the county was all but forgotten in the post-revolution land grants and general confusion of the following decades. It was thought to be abolished in 1858, but was not officially declared defunct until 1871.

References

Populated places disestablished in 1871
Former counties of Texas
1871 disestablishments in the United States